NER Class M refers to two classes of steam locomotive of the North Eastern Railway:

 NER Class M, later NER Class 3CC
 NER Class M, formerly NER Class M1